Afrotragulus is an extinct genus of tragulid ruminant which existed in Kenya during the early Miocene period. It contains the species Afrotragulus moruorotensis and Afrotragulus parvus, formerly classified in genus Dorcatherium, as well as A. akhtari, A. megalomilos, and A. moralesi.

References

Chevrotains
Miocene even-toed ungulates
Fossil taxa described in 2010
Miocene mammals of Africa
Prehistoric even-toed ungulate genera